The 2022 Sun Bowl was a college football bowl game played on December 30, 2022, at the Sun Bowl in El Paso, Texas. The 88th annual Sun Bowl, the game featured Pittsburgh from the Atlantic Coast Conference (ACC) and UCLA from the Pac-12 Conference. The game began at 12:13 p.m. MST and was aired on CBS. It was one of the 2022–23 bowl games concluding the 2022 FBS football season. Sponsored by Kellogg's Frosted Flakes breakfast cereal, the game was officially known as the Tony the Tiger Sun Bowl, after its mascot, Tony the Tiger.

Teams
The bowl has tie-ins with the Atlantic Coast Conference (ACC) and the Pac-12 Conference, who supplied Pittsburgh and UCLA, respectively, for the game. This will be the 15th meeting between the programs; the Bruins lead the all-time series, 9–5.

Pitt

Pittsburgh played to a 8–4 regular-season record, 5–3 in conference play. They were ranked as high as No. 17. in September, but fell out of the rankings after losing two of their first five games. The Panthers finished their regular season with four consecutive wins. They faced three ranked FBS teams during the season, defeating Syracuse while losing to Tennessee and North Carolina.

Several days before the game, three Pittsburgh players had their flight from Dallas to El Paso canceled on Christmas Day, but were able to make the  trip via a carpool with Joe Golding, head basketball coach of the UTEP Miners men's basketball team, who was making the same Dallas-to-El Paso journey with his family.

UCLA

UCLA compiled a 9–3 regular-season record, 6–3 in conference play. They opened the season with six consecutive wins, but then lost three of their next five games. They faced four ranked opponents during the season, defeating Washington and Utah while losing to Oregon and USC. Ranked as high as No. 9 during the season, the Bruins enter the bowl ranked No. 18 in major polls. Appearing in their fifth Sun Bowl, UCLA is 3–1 in prior editions of the bowl.

Game summary

Statistics

References

Sun Bowl
Sun Bowl
Sun Bowl
Sun Bowl
Pittsburgh Panthers football bowl games
UCLA Bruins football bowl games